Mueang Nan is the capital district (amphoe mueang) of Nan province, northern Thailand.

History
The district was Khwaeng Nakhon Nan, set up in 1899 by the Ministry of Interior. It was renamed Mueang Nan District in 1917. Khun Yommana Nattikan was the first district officer.

Geography
Neighboring districts are from the north clockwise Tha Wang Pha, Santi Suk, Phu Phiang, Wiang Sa, Ban Luang of Nan Province and Pong of Phayao province.

Administration
The district is divided into 11 sub-districts (tambons), which are further subdivided into 107 villages (mubans). Nan is a town (thesaban mueang) and covers the complete tambon Nai Wiang and parts of tambon Pha Sing. There are also two townships (thesaban tambon), Du Tai and Kong Khwai, which cover the complete tambon Du Tai and Kong Khwai, respectively. The other eight tambons are tambon administrative organizations (TAO).

Missing numbers are tambon which now form Phu Phiang District.

References

Mueang Nan